Herman Myers (January 18, 1847 – March 24, 1909) was a politician from Georgia, United States and a Mayor of Savannah. He was a Democrat.

Background

He was a Jewish German-born immigrant and was born in Bavaria in 1847. His family moved to Virginia when he was a child.

Political career

Alderman

Myers served as Councilmember from 1885 to 1895.

Mayor

He ran for Mayor of Savannah in 1895 and won the election. He lost re-election against Peter Meldrim in 1897. However, he was returned to office in 1899 and won re-election in 1901, 1903 and 1905.

The Union Station and the new City Hall were constructed under his tenure as mayor. Myers did not run for re-election in 1907.

Death

He died in Savannah on March 24, 1909.

References

External links
Mayor's official site

1847 births
1909 deaths
Mayors of Savannah, Georgia
Georgia (U.S. state) Democrats